The Burke Developmental Road is a Queensland (Australia) developmental road.

The road crosses the Gilbert River. This bridge was named after two of the region's indigenous leaders, Lily and Jubilee Slattery.
It may become impassable during the wet season.
In mid-2007, A$28 million worth of funding was allocated for the widening of the road.

Northern Australia Beef Roads upgrades
The Northern Australia Beef Roads Program announced in 2016 included two projects for the Burke Developmental Road.

Pavement strengthening
The project for progressive sealing works between Chillago and Almaden (Package One) was completed in early 2020 at a total cost of $4.7 million.

The project for progressive sealing works between Chillago and Almaden (Package Two) was completed in early 2020 at a total cost of $2.7 million.

Other upgrades

Replace bridge
A project to replace the Butcher Creek bridge, at a cost of $10.7 million, was completed in December 2021.

Progressive sealing
A project to progressively seal sections of the road between Normanton and Dimbulah, at a cost of $14 million, was expected to complete in June 2022.

Another project to progressively seal sections of the road between Almaden and Chillagoe, at a cost of $14.8 million, was to be completed by late 2022.

Major Intersections

Gallery

See also

 Highways in Australia
 List of highways in Queensland

References

Highways in Queensland
North West Queensland